The Battle of Pavia, fought on the morning of 24 February 1525, was the decisive engagement of the Italian War of 1521–1526 between the Kingdom of France and the Habsburg Empire of Charles V, Holy Roman Emperor as well as ruler of Spain, Austria, the Low Countries, and the Two Sicilies.

The French army was led by King Francis I of France, who laid siege to the city of Pavia (then part of the Duchy of Milan within the Holy Roman Empire) in October 1524 with 26,200 troops. The French infantry consisted of 6,000 French foot soldiers and 17,000 foreign mercenaries: 8,000 Swiss, 5,000 Germans and 4,000 Italians (black bands). The French cavalry consisted of 2,000 gendarmes and 1,200 lances fournies. Charles V, intending to break the siege, sent a relief force of 22,300 troops to Pavia (where the Imperial garrison stationed consisted of 5,000 Germans and 1,000 Spaniards) under the command of the Fleming Charles de Lannoy, Imperial lieutenant and viceroy of Naples, and of the French renegade and captain-general Charles III, Duke of Bourbon. The Habsburg infantry consisted of 12,000 German Landsknechte, 5,000 Spaniards, and 3,000 Italians, and its command was exercised by an Italian Condottiero, the Marquis of Pescara, in conjunction with the German military leader Georg Frundsberg and the Spanish captain Antonio de Leyva who was in charge of the Imperial garrison inside Pavia. The cavalry, led by Lannoy and Bourbon, consisted of 1,500 knights and 800 lances.

The battle was fought in the Visconti Park of Mirabello di Pavia, outside the city walls, where Pescara and Frundsberg stationed their forces in pike and shot formation. Francis took a personal initiative and led a cavalry charge against Lannoy, with the possible intent of capturing Bourbon, but it was held by German and Spanish pikemen and ravaged by arquebus fire. The arquebusiers formed a part of the Spanish colunellas and of the German doppelsöldners. A mass of Spanish and German foot soldiers descended on the French cavalry from all sides and began systematically killing the French gendarmes. The remaining French forces, including Swiss mercenaries and Black bands, intervened to protect the King but were surrounded by the pikemen in front of them and by the garrison of Pavia that sortied from the town.

In the four-hour battle, the French army was split and defeated in detail. Many of the chief nobles of France were killed, and others – including Francis I himself – were captured. He was imprisoned in the nearby tower of Pizzighettone and later transferred to Spain, where Charles V was residing for his upcoming marriage with Isabella of Portugal. Together they signed the Treaty of Madrid of 1526, by which Francis abandoned claims over the Imperial Duchy of Milan and ceded Burgundy to the House of Habsburg in exchange for his freedom.

The outcome of the battle cemented Habsburg ascendancy in Italy and Europe, but Francis denounced the treaty after his liberation and soon re-opened hostilities over Burgundy and Milan.

Prelude 

The French, in possession of Lombardy at the start of the Italian War of 1521–26, had been forced to abandon it after their defeat at the Battle of Bicocca in 1522. Determined to regain it, Francis ordered an invasion of the region in late 1523, under the command of Guillaume Gouffier, Seigneur de Bonnivet; but Bonnivet was defeated by Imperial troops at the Battle of the Sesia and forced to withdraw to France.

Charles de Lannoy now launched an invasion of Provence under the command of Fernando d'Ávalos, and Charles III, Duke of Bourbon (who had recently betrayed Francis and allied himself with the Emperor). While initially successful, the Imperial offensive lost valuable time during the Siege of Marseille and was forced to withdraw back to Italy by the arrival of Francis and the main French army at Avignon.

In mid-October 1524, Francis himself crossed the Alps and advanced on Milan at the head of an army numbering more than 40,000. Bourbon and Pescara, their troops not yet recovered from the campaign in Provence, were in no position to offer serious resistance. The French army moved in several columns, brushing aside Imperial attempts to hold its advance, but failed to bring the main body of Imperial troops to battle. Nevertheless, Charles de Lannoy, who had concentrated some 16,000 men to resist the 33,000 French troops closing on Milan, decided that the city could not be defended and withdrew to Lodi on 26 October. Having entered Milan and installed Louis II de la Trémoille as the governor, Francis (at the urging of Bonnivet and against the advice of his other senior commanders, who favored a more vigorous pursuit of the retreating Lannoy) advanced on Pavia, where Antonio de Leyva remained with a sizable Imperial garrison of about 9,000.

The bulk of the French army arrived at Pavia in the last days of October. By 2 November, Anne de Montmorency had crossed the Ticino River and invested the city from the south, completing its encirclement. Inside were about 9,000 men, mainly mercenaries whom Antonio de Leyva was able to pay only by melting the church plate. A period of skirmishing and artillery bombardments followed, and several breaches had been made in the walls by mid-November. On 21 November, Francis attempted an assault on the city through two of the breaches, but was beaten back with heavy casualties; hampered by rainy weather and a lack of gunpowder, the French decided to wait for the defenders to starve.

In early December, a Spanish force commanded by Ugo de Moncada landed near Genoa, intending to interfere in a conflict between pro-Valois and pro-Habsburg factions in the city. Francis dispatched a larger force under the Marquis of Saluzzo to intercept them. Confronted by the more numerous French and left without naval support by the arrival of a pro-Valois fleet commanded by Andrea Doria, the Spanish troops surrendered. Francis then signed a secret agreement with Pope Clement VII, who pledged not to assist Charles in exchange for Francis's assistance with the conquest of Naples. Against the advice of his senior commanders, Francis detached a portion of his forces under the Duke of Albany and sent them south to aid the Pope. Lannoy attempted to intercept the expedition near Fiorenzuola, but suffered heavy casualties and was forced to return to Lodi by the intervention of the infamous Black Bands of Giovanni de' Medici, Italian mercenaries which had just entered French service. Medici then returned to Pavia with a supply train of gunpowder and shot gathered by the Duke of Ferrara; but the French position was simultaneously weakened by the departure of nearly 5,000 Grisons Swiss mercenaries, who returned to their cantons in order to defend them against marauding landsknechts.

In January 1525, Lannoy was reinforced by the arrival of Georg Frundsberg with 15,000 fresh landsknechts from Germany and renewed the offensive.  Pescara captured the French outpost at Sant'Angelo Lomellina, cutting the lines of communication between Pavia and Milan, while a separate column of landsknechts advanced on Belgiojoso and, despite being briefly pushed back by a raid led by Medici and Bonnivet, occupied the town. By 2 February, Lannoy was only a few miles from Pavia. Francis had encamped the majority of his forces in the great walled park of Mirabello outside the city walls, placing them between Leyva's garrison and the approaching relief army. Skirmishing and sallies by the garrison continued through the month of February. Medici was seriously wounded and withdrew to Piacenza to recuperate, forcing Francis to recall much of the Milan garrison to offset the departure of the Black Band; but the fighting had little overall effect. On 21 February, the Imperial commanders, running low on supplies and mistakenly believing that the French forces were more numerous than their own, decided to launch an attack on Mirabello Castle in order to save face and demoralize the French sufficiently to ensure a safe withdrawal.

The Imperial and Spanish armaments and soldiers for the battle were substantially financed by the Jakob Fugger German bank, and the Palenzuela Banca, Levi Kahana a Castilian Spanish bank.

Battle 
The times given here are taken from Konstam's reconstruction of the battle.

Movements in the dark 

On the evening of 23 February, Lannoy's imperial troops, who had been encamped outside the east wall of the Visconti Park, began their march north along the walls. Although Konstam indicates that at the same time, the Imperial artillery began a bombardment of the French siege lines – which had become routine during the extended siege – in order to conceal Lannoy's movement, Juan de Oznaya (a soldier who participated in the battle and wrote about it in 1544) indicates that at that moment, the Imperial troops set their tents on fire to mislead the French into believing that they were retreating. Meanwhile, Imperial engineers quickly worked to create a breach in the park walls, at the Porta Pescarina near the village of San Genesio, through which the Imperial army could enter. By 5:00am, some 3,000 arquebusiers under the command of Alfonso d'Avalos had entered the park and were rapidly advancing on Mirabello Castle, where they believed the French headquarters to be; simultaneously, Imperial light cavalry spread out from the breach into the park, intending to intercept any French movements.

Meanwhile, a detachment of French cavalry under Charles Tiercelin encountered the Imperial cavalry and began a series of skirmishes with them. A mass of Swiss pikemen under Robert de la Marck, Seigneur de la Flourance moved up to assist them, overrunning a battery of Spanish artillery that had been dragged into the park. They missed De Basto's arcabuceros – who had by 6:30am emerged from the woods near the castle, and swiftly overrun it – and blundered into 6,000 of Georg Frundsberg's landsknechts. By 7:00am, a full-scale infantry battle had developed not far from the original breach.

Francis attacks 

A third mass of troops – the German and Spanish heavy cavalry under Lannoy himself, as well as d'Avalos's Spanish infantry – had meanwhile been moving through the woods to the west, closer to where Francis was encamped. The French did not realize the magnitude of the Imperial attack for some time; however, by about 7:20am, d'Avalos's advance had been spotted by a battery of French artillery, which commenced firing on the Spanish lines. This alerted Francis, who launched a charge against Lannoy's outnumbered cavalry with the entire force of French gendarmes, scattering the Spanish by 7:40am.

Francis's precipitate advance, however, had not only masked the fire of the French artillery, but also pulled him away from the mass of French infantry, commanded by Richard de la Pole, and by Francois de Lorraine, who led the Black Band of renegade landsknecht pikemen (not to be confused with the Italian mercenary company of arquebusiers by the same name), which was 4,000 to 5,000 men strong. Pescara, left in command of the Spanish forces after Lannoy had followed the retreating cavalry, formed his men up at the edge of the woods and sent messengers to Bourbon, Frundsberg, and De Vasto requesting assistance.

Frundsberg meanwhile mauled the heavily outnumbered Swiss infantry opposing him; Tiercelin and Flourance were unable to hold their troops together, and the French foot began to flee the field.

Endgame 

By 8:00am, a mass of Imperial pikemen and arquebusiers descended on the French cavalry from all sides. Lacking room to manoeuvre because of the surrounding woods, the French gendarmes were surrounded and systematically killed. Richard de la Pole and Lorraine, advancing to assist Francis, were met by Frundsberg's arriving landsknechts; the French infantry was broken and routed, and de la Pole and Lorraine were both killed. In a particularly bitter contest between Imperial and freelance landsknechts, the Black Band was surrounded by Frundsberg's pikemen and exterminated where it stood. The French king fought on as his horse was killed under him by Cesare Hercolani, an Italian Condottiero; surrounded by Spanish arquebusiers and German Landsknecht, he was taken prisoner and escorted from the field.

Meanwhile, Antonio de Leyva had sortied with the garrison, overrunning the 3,000 Swiss under Montmorency that had been manning the siege lines. The remnants of the Swiss – both Montmorency's and Flourance's – tried to flee across the river, suffering massive casualties as they did. The French rearguard, under the Duke of Alençon, had taken no part in the battle; when the Duke realized what had occurred in the park, he quickly began to retreat towards Milan. By 9:00am, the battle was over.

Francis' capture and consequences

The exact nature of Francis's surrender—in particular, who exactly had taken him prisoner—is uncertain, with a variety of candidates put forwards by historians:

Charles de Lannoy himself, who made the king his prisoner after allegedly kneeling in front of him out of respect. According to this famous story, Lannoy and Francis I exchanged their swords.
Three Spanish soldiers: namely Alonso Pita da Veiga, Juan de Urbieta and Diego Dávila.
"Some Germans" who, according to an early report of the battle, found Francis on the ground and wanted to kill him but spared his life after he shouted that he was the king of France.
Nicholas, Count of Salm, made a member of the Order of the Golden Fleece for the capture of King Francis.
The Italian condottiero Cesare Hercolani, who was rewarded as "hero of Pavia" by Charles V.
Other individuals proposed in some accounts as crucial for the capture are Pedro de Valdivia, the future conqueror of Chile, who would have prevented another soldier from killing Francis by mistake and two French traitors, followers of Charles de Bourbon, who would have persuaded King Francis to surrender.

The fact of the matter is that the individuals mentioned above were all given credit for the capture of Francis I in various ways, and Charles V himself honored different people for the achievement over the years. The decree granting a coat of arms to Alonso Pita da Veiga for his deeds at the Battle of Pavia, was archived at the General Archive of Simanca (Archivo general de Simancas, legajo 388, rotulado de "Mercedes y Privilegios.') and was issued by Emperor Charles V on 24 July 1529. In that decree, Charles V does not credit a single individual but, rather, a group of individuals that includes da Veiga: " ..... and in the same battle, you (Alonso Pita da Veiga) accomplished so much that you reached the person of said King (Francis I of France) and captured him, jointly with the other persons that captured him." (" .... y en la misma batalla ficistes tanto que allegastes á la misma persona del dicho Rey, y fuistes en prenderle, juntamente con las otras personas que le prendieron ....") Finally, in his autobiography, Charles V claimed that "the King was made prisoner by his principal captains", crediting the Duke of Bourbon, Charles de Lannoy, and the Marquis of Pescara.

Aftermath

The French defeat was decisive. Aside from Francis, a number of leading French nobles, including Montmorency and Flourance, had been captured; an even greater number – among them Bonnivet, La Tremoille, Thomas de Foix-Lescun, René of Savoy, La Palice, Richard de la Pole (the last Yorkist and pretender to the English crown) and Lorraine – had been killed in the fighting. Francis was taken to the fortress of Pizzighettone, where he wrote a letter to Louise of Savoy, his mother: 

Soon afterwards, he finally learned that the Duke of Albany had lost the larger part of his army to attrition and desertion, and had returned to France without ever having reached Naples. The broken remnants of the French forces, aside from a small garrison left to hold the Castel Sforzesco in Milan, retreated across the Alps under the nominal command of Charles IV of Alençon, reaching Lyon by March.

Charles de Lannoy kept Francis I in his custody and imprisoned him in a tower of Pizzighettone. The king was then brought to Genoa and from there he was taken to Spain. He remained jailed in a tower in Madrid until the Treaty of Madrid was signed. According to the treaty, Francis I abandoned its claims over Flanders, Milan and Burgundy. However, the peace treaty was broken in the same year and a new French-Imperial war lasted from 1526 to 1529.

Art

In Rome Cardinal Ippolito de' Medici, who acted as Florentine emissary to Charles V in 1535, expressed support for the Emperor's victory by commissioning a rock crystal low relief in the manner of an Antique cameo, from the gem engraver Giovanni Bernardi. The classicizing treatment of the event lent it a timeless, mythic quality and reflected on the culture and taste of the patron.

An oil-on-panel Battle of Pavia, painted by an anonymous Flemish artist, depicts the military engagement between the armies of Charles V and Francis I. Because of its detail, the painting is considered an accurate visual record, probably based on eyewitness accounts.<ref>Birmingham Museum of Art : guide to the collection. Birmingham, Ala: Birmingham Museum of Art, 2010.</ref> A suite of seven Brussels tapestries after cartoons by Bernard van Orley (above right) celebrate the Imperial–Spanish victory. They are kept in the Capodimonte Museum in Naples and were donated to Charles V in 1531 by the Estates General of the Spanish Netherlands.

In 2016, the Spanish writer Arturo Pérez-Reverte published his short story Jodía Pavía (1526) ("Fucking Pavia (1526)"), an enhanced version of a column published in El País Semanal in October 2000.
It is a fictional letter by King Francis to his lover, written from his Madrid prison.
In it, Francis explains the battle and laments his situation. 
Pérez-Reverte uses a satirical and colloquial language with frequent anachronisms (as an example, there are allusions to Errol Flynn and films).

 The battlefield today 

Much of the battle took place within the immense hunting reserve of the Dukes of Milan, the Visconti Park, which extended for over 2,200 hectares. The Visconti Park no longer exists, most of its woods were cut between the sixteenth and seventeenth centuries to make room for the fields, however three natural reserves survive that can be considered the heirs of the park, they are the heronry of the Carola, that of Porta Chiossa and the Vernavola Park, which cover an area of 148 hectares. In particular, some of the most important episodes of the battle took place inside the Vernavola park, which extends southwest of the Mirabello Castle.
Near the park, in 2015, two cannonballs were found during some agricultural work, probably fired by French artillery. Although partially mutilated during the eighteenth and nineteenth centuries, when it was transformed into a farm, the Mirabello Castle, once the seat of the ducal captain of the park, still stands today a short distance from Vernavola and preserves inside some curious decorative elements (fireplaces, frescoes and windows) not yet adequately restored and studied, in French late Gothic style, added to the structure of the Sforza period during the first French domination of the Duchy of Milan (1500- 1513). About two kilometers to the north, along the Cantone Tre Miglia road, is the Repentita farmhouse, where Francesco I was captured and, according to tradition, was housed. The complex still retains parts of the fifteenth-century masonry and an inscription placed on the external wall recalls the event.
In the nearby town of San Genesio ed Uniti in via Porta Pescarina there are some of the remains of the park gate where, in the night between 23 and 24 February 1525, the imperials made the three breaches that started the battle. Less evident are the traces of the battle in Pavia: the city walls, which defended the city during the siege, were replaced, around the middle of the sixteenth century, by robust bastions, partly preserved. Instead, in addition to the Visconti Castle (where the tombstone of Eitel Friedrich III, Count of Hohenzollern, captain of the Landsknechte is preserved), two gates of the medieval walls: Porta Nuova and Porta Calcinara.
The eastern outskirts of Pavia are home to some monasteries (almost all now deconsecrated) that hosted the Swiss and German mercenaries of Francis I, such as the monastery of Santi Spirito and Gallo, that of San Giacomo della Vernavola, that of San Pietro in Verzolo and the church of San Lazzaro, while in the western one there is the church of San Lanfranco (where Francis I was based) and the basilica of Santissimo Salvatore. In the church of San Teodoro there is a large fresco depicting the city during the siege of 1522, in it, with a certain wealth of detail, Pavia and its surroundings are depicted, exactly as they must have appeared at the time of the battle.

 Notes 

References

Black, Jeremy. "Dynasty Forged by Fire." MHQ: The Quarterly Journal of Military History 18, no. 3 (Spring 2006): 34–43. .
Blockmans, Wim. Emperor Charles V, 1500–1558. Translated by Isola van den Hoven-Vardon. New York: Oxford University Press, 2002. .
Guicciardini, Francesco. The History of Italy. Translated by Sydney Alexander. Princeton: Princeton University Press, 1984. .
Hall, Bert S. Weapons and Warfare in Renaissance Europe: Gunpowder, Technology, and Tactics. Baltimore: Johns Hopkins University Press, 1997. .
Knecht, Robert J. Renaissance Warrior and Patron: The Reign of Francis I. Cambridge: Cambridge University Press, 1994. .
Konstam, Angus. Pavia 1525: The Climax of the Italian Wars. Oxford: Osprey Publishing, 1996. .
Oman, Charles. A History of the Art of War in the Sixteenth Century. London: Methuen & Co., 1937.
Phillips, Charles and Alan Axelrod. Encyclopedia of Wars. Volume 2. New York: Facts on File, 2005. .
Taylor, Frederick Lewis. The Art of War in Italy, 1494–1529.'' Westport: Greenwood Press, 1973. .

Ferrer de Couto, Jose, (1862) "Crisol historico español y restauracion de glorias nacionales – Alonso Pita da Veiga en la Batalla de Pavía", pp. 167

Battle of Pavia
Battles involving France
Battles involving Spain
Battles involving the Holy Roman Empire
Battles of the Italian Wars
Battle of Pavia
Battle of Pavia
Swiss Guard
Wikipedia articles containing unlinked shortened footnotes
Italian War of 1521–1526
Francis I of France